The 2018–19 Perth Scorchers Women's season was the fourth in the team's history. Coached by Lisa Keightley and captained by Meg Lanning, they finished fifth in the regular season of WBBL04 and consequently failed to qualify for the finals for the first time.

Squad 

Each 2018–19 squad featured 15 active players, with an allowance of up to five marquee signings including a maximum of three from overseas. Under a new rule, Australian marquees were classed as players who held a national women's team contract at the time of signing on for their WBBL|04 team.

Personnel changes before and during the season included:

 Overseas marquee Katherine Brunt, who had won the team's Most Valuable Player award for the first three seasons, and fellow English player Nat Sciver would not return for WBBL|04.
 The Scorchers filled their vacant marquee positions with England players Kate Cross and Amy Jones. Cross, who had previously played in the WBBL for the Brisbane Heat, and Jones, who had previously won a WBBL title as a replacement player with the Sydney Sixers, entered the season with cricket experience in Perth as members of the Western Fury in the WNCL.
 19-year-old fast bowler Hayleigh Brennan joined the Scorchers, having played for the Melbourne Stars in the previous season.
 Meg Lanning assumed the captaincy, having missed the entirety of the previous season after undergoing shoulder surgery. She would, however, continue to deal with more injury issues throughout WBBL|04, leaving Elyse Villani to stand in as acting captain for five matches.
 Nicole Bolton withdrew from the squad for the last three games of the season due to personal reasons.
 Hayley Jensen was signed as a replacement player for six games that Lanning and Bolton were collectively unavailable for. A permanent Australian resident, Jensen had played in the two previous WBBL seasons as a local player for the Melbourne Renegades. However, due to earning re-selection in her native New Zealand national team, she could only compete in WBBL|04 as an overseas marquee.
 Bhavisha Devchand joined the squad initially as a local replacement player for Amy Jones who would miss the first game of the season due to a resting policy enforced by the England and Wales Cricket Board. Devchand continued to serve as a replacement player throughout the season for Piepa Cleary, who would miss several games after undergoing surgery on a fractured and dislocated thumb sustained during a practice match, and later for Elyse Villani, who would sit out three games with a hamstring injury.

The table below lists the Scorchers players and their key stats (including runs scored, batting strike rate, wickets taken, economy rate, catches and stumpings) for the season.

Ladder

Fixtures 

All times are local time

The Thunder were catapulted to a score of 5/179 by a late 49-run partnership between Harmanpreet Kaur and Stafanie Taylor (which included 21 runs off the 18th over against the bowling of Taneale Peschel, who had taken 1/12 in her first three overs). Eight overs into the second innings, captain Meg Lanning had scored 71 of the Scorchers' 83 runs. Although Lanning was run out for 76 in the tenth over, Elyse Villani went on to score 66 not out, guiding the Scorchers to a six-wicket victory with one ball remaining. In doing so, the Scorchers set a new WBBL record for highest successful run chase.

Statistics and awards 

 Most runs: Elyse Villani – 403 (6th in the league)
 Highest score in an innings: Meg Lanning – 76 (40) vs Sydney Thunder, 29 December 2018
 Most wickets: Heather Graham – 22 (equal 1st in the league)
 Best bowling figures in an innings: Nicole Bolton – 3/20 (4 overs) vs Hobart Hurricanes, 18 December 2018
 Most catches (fielder): Kate Cross – 7 (equal 9th in the league)
 Player of the Match awards:
 Heather Graham – 3
 Meg Lanning – 2
 Nicole Bolton, Amy Jones, Elyse Villani – 1 each
 Scorchers Player of the Year: Heather Graham
 WBBL|04 Player of the Tournament: Meg Lanning (equal 4th), Elyse Villani (7th)
 WBBL|04 Team of the Tournament: Heather Graham, Meg Lanning

References 

2018–19 Women's Big Bash League season by team
Perth Scorchers (WBBL)